Billing is a surname of English, German, and Scandinavian origin that usually derives from a personal name or habitation.

 Amanda Billing (born 1976), New Zealand actress
 Amar Singh Billing (born 1944), Indian cyclist
 Archibald Billing (1791–1881), English physician
 Clara Billing (1881–1963), English artist
 Einar Billing (1871–1939), Swedish theologian
 Eve Billing (1923–2019), UK plant pathologist
 Graham Billing (1936–2001), New Zealand novelist and poet
 Heinz Billing (1914–2017), German physicist and computer scientist
 Hermann Billing (1867–1946), German architect and designer
 Johanna Billing (born 1973), Swedish artist
 John Billing (1816–1863), British architect
 Kevin Billing (born 1944), Australian footballer
 McGregor Billing (1887–1965), South African cricketer
 Noel Pemberton Billing (1881–1948), English politician
 Norman Billing (1913–1989), Australian politician
 Peter Billing (born 1964), English footballer
 Philip Billing (born 1996), Danish footballer
 Robert Billing (died 1898), English Anglican suffragan bishop
 Roy Billing (born 1947), New Zealand television actor
 Thomas Billing (died 1481), Chief Justice of the King's Bench

See also
 Billing (disambiguation)
 Billings (surname)

References